The Brass Ankles of South Carolina, also referred to as Croatan, lived in the swamp areas of Goose Creek, SC and Holly Hill, SC (Crane Pond) in order to escape the harshness of racism and the Indian Removal Act. African slaves and European indentured servants sought refuge amongst the Indians and collectively formed a successful community. Many of them are direct descendants of Robert Sweat and Margarate Cornish. 

Although these individuals were of mixed ancestry and free before the American Civil War, after Reconstruction, white Democrats regained power in the South and imposed racial segregation and white supremacy under Jim Crow laws. United States Census surveys included a category of "mulatto" until 1930 when the powerful Southern bloc in Congress pushed through requirements to have people classified only as black or white. By that time, most Southern states had passed laws under which persons of any known black ancestry were required to be classified in state records as black, under what is known as the "one-drop rule" of hypodescent. 

The binary classifications required individuals to be classified as white or black, even if they had long been recorded and identified as "Indian" (Native American) or mixed race. However, most self-identified as Croatan according to death certificates. The surnames repeatedly represented among the Brass Ankles according to the 1910 Holly Hill, SC Census records have included: Weatherford, Platt, Pye, Jackson, Chavis, Bunch, Driggers, Sweat (Swett), Williams, Russell, Scott, Wilder, and Goins. Some of these also are commonly represented among other mixed-race groups, such as the Melungeon in Tennessee and the Lumbee people in North Carolina. Over time, people of mixed race often identified with and married more frequently into one or another of the major ethnic groups, becoming part of the white, black, or the Beaver Creek Indians community, for instance. Some of the Sweat, Chavis, and Driggers families migrated from the Marlboro County, South Carolina area in the early 1800s.       

Numerous people of mixed race have lived in a section of Orangeburg County near Holly Hill called Crane Pond. The term "brass ankles" generally was applied to those of mixed ancestry. They often had a large majority of white ancestry and would have been considered legally white in early 19th-century society. The Crane Pond community has maintained its cultural continuity. Reflecting on their ethnic diverse ancestry, there are many local stories about the origins of these people.

Some people formerly classified as "Brass Ankles" have been identified as among ancestors of members of the five Native American tribes officially recognized by the state of South Carolina in 2005, such as the Wassamasaw Tribe of Varnertown Indians. Because such tribe members often had multiracial ancestry including Africans, and their white neighbors did not understand much about Indian culture, they were often arbitrarily classified as mulatto by census enumerators, who were most concerned about African ancestry. After 1930, when the US census dropped the Mulatto classification at the instigation of the southern white Democratic Congressional block, such multiracial people were often thereafter classified as black, a designation in the South used for anyone visibly "of color". 

Contrary to some assertions, each US census through the nineteenth century had the category of Indian available for use by census takers. But, especially in the late 19th century, census enumerators often used this category only for those people living on Indian reservations or at least showing culturally that they fit what the census takers assumed was the "Indian" culture. Persons who were outwardly assimilated to the majority culture were generally classified as white, black or mulatto, depending on appearance and on the appearance of their neighbors. Dubose Heyward, author of Porgy and Bess, with music by George Gershwin, wrote a play about the Brass Ankles, set in the aftermath of the Civil War.  

Some Brass Ankles in the community of Summerville, South Carolina identified as "Summerville Indians." During the early part of the twentieth century, when public schools were segregated for white or black students, the Summerville Indians and other Brass Ankle groups gained state approval to establish some local, separate schools for their own Indian children. Having come from families free long before the American Civil War, they did not want to send their children to school with descendants of freedmen. The Eureka "Ricka" school in Charleston County was an example of such an Indian school.

See also
 Redlegs
 Redbone (ethnicity)

References in popular culture
Play by Dubose Heyward about Brass Ankles.

References

External links

 Mestee Groups of the South, Black Dutch blog
 "Adventures in the Gene Pool", The Wilson Quarterly, 1 January 2003, at Goliath Website
 

Multiracial ethnic groups in the United States
Ethnic groups in South Carolina
Native American history of South Carolina
African–Native American relations
African-American history of South Carolina
Multiracial affairs in the United States